Predtechenka is a village in the Moskva District of Chüy Region of Kyrgyzstan. Its population was 1,665 in 2021.

References

Populated places in Chüy Region